is a former Japanese football player. He played for Japan national team.

Club career
Seta was born in Morioka on January 15, 1952. After graduating from high school, he joined Hitachi in 1970. In 1972, the club won the champions in Japan Soccer League and Emperor's Cup. The club also won 1975 Emperor's Cup and 1976 JSL Cup. He retired in 1980. He played 164 games in the league. He was selected Best Eleven in 1972 and 1976. In 1982, he came back as playing-coach, but he did not play in the match. He retired again in 1986.

National team career
In May 1973, Seta was selected Japan national team for 1974 World Cup qualification. At this competition, on May 22, he debuted against Hong Kong. He also played at 1974 Asian Games. In 1976, he played as a regular goalkeeper and played in all matches at 1976 Summer Olympics qualification. In 1980, he played for Japan for the first time in 4 years at 1980 Summer Olympics qualification. This qualification was his last game for Japan. He played 25 games for Japan until 1980.

Club statistics

National team statistics

References

External links
 
 Japan National Football Team Database

1952 births
Living people
Association football people from Iwate Prefecture
Japanese footballers
Japan international footballers
Japan Soccer League players
Kashiwa Reysol players
Footballers at the 1974 Asian Games
Association football goalkeepers
Asian Games competitors for Japan